The 2009 Asian Aerobic Gymnastics Championships were the first edition of the Asian Aerobic Gymnastics Championships, and were held in Bangkok, Thailand from March 27 to March 29, 2009.

Medal summary

Medal table

References

Asian
Asian Gymnastics Championships
2009 in Thai sport
International gymnastics competitions hosted by Thailand